Stefano Lentini (born 26 November 1974) is a music composer based in Rome, Italy. He has composed and produced music extensively for film, television and theatre, working in a large variety of genres.

His first instrument was a classic guitar made by his grandfather, who was a carpenter, out of some old wardrobe doors. He started composing and recording music at a very early age. A multi-instrumentalist, Lentini is known for his use of original tunes on guitar, but also plays piano, bass, drums, flute, lute and several other instruments, often playing all of these on his albums through the use of multitrack recording. This multitude of instruments, including string orchestrations, figure prominently in his compositions, giving his music a symphonic sound.

Stefano Lentini's television work has screened in Italy and around the world, and includes the TV Series [The Sea Beyond], The Red Door SE01-02, Braccialetti Rossi SE01-SE02-SE03" (International Emmy Kids Awards nominee), "El Maestro", Bakhita, Drawn for Jury Duty. 
He composed the soundtrack for feature films “Maresia” (Premiered at 2015 Festival des Films du Monde, Montreal), “The Nest of the Turtledove” (Best Ukrainian Film Odessa 2016), “Grazing The Wall” (Selected at 69th Venice International Film Festival). 
His album Stabat Mater was iTunes Top 10 Original Score Albums in Belgium, Italy, France, Hong Kong, Singapore and Taiwan. It was No.1 in Hong Kong.

Lentini makes use of a variety of instruments, often playing many of them himself on the same track and writes music in various time signatures. He is considered part of the cross-chamber music, but his influences are very broad. Lentini' music often has spiritual themes, and many songs draw inspiration from real stories.

Biography
Lentini' first instrument was the guitar, built by his grandfather with the doors of an antique wardrobe. Ever since he was young he dedicated himself to the composition and arrangement of music. He made his debut at the Folkstudio, a historic nightclub in Rome. He graduated with high honours in Cultural Anthropology and studied Ethnomusicology in Rome and in London.

A multi-instrumentalist, Stefano Lentini is known for his use of non-conventional tunes on guitar, but also plays electric bass, piano, drums, and several other instruments, often playing all of these on his albums through the use of multitrack recording. While in school, he studied the lute and flute, which he also plays on his albums. This multitude of instruments, including string orchestrations, figure prominently in his compositions, giving his music a symphonic sound.

Selected filmography

Discography
 Studio Battaglia, Colonna sonora originale della Serie Tv Curci (2022)
 Mare Fuori Seconda Stagione, Colonna sonora originale della Serie Tv Rai Com (2022)
 Venere Coloora (2020)
 Mare Fuori, Colonna sonora originale della Serie Tv Rai Com (2020)
 The Devil's Clock, Colonna sonora originale della Serie Tv Cinevox (2020)
 La Porta Rossa Season 02, Colonna sonora originale della Serie Tv Rai Com (2019)
 Fury Coloora Records (2018)
 La porta rossa, Colonna sonora originale della Serie Tv Rai Com (2017)
 Stabat Mater - As Seen in Wong Kar Wai's "The Grandmaster" Milan Records, Warner Classics (2013)
 Watanka Original Music from the Television Series Braccialetti rossi , Edizioni Curci (2014)
 Non è mai troppo tardi Original Motion Picture Soundtrack, RAI (2014)
 Bakhita Original Motion Picture Soundtrack, RAI (2011)
 Cinematic Soundscape Soundtrack, RAI (2011)
 Tango & Popular Vibes Soundtrack, RAI (2011)
 Il sorteggio Original Soundtrack Motion Picture, RAI (2010)
 Una piccola piccola storia, Le Disco de Rondone (2009)
 Shooting Silvio Original Soundtrack, C.A.M. Original Soundtracks (2007)
 Soundtrack Sampler, Various Artists, C.A.M. Original Soundtracks (2007)
 Soundtrack Sampler, Various Artists, C.A.M. Original Soundtracks (2006)
 Super Naim Experience, Self produced (1999)Collaborations:'''
 Braccialetti Rossi, Carosello (2014)
 In un altro Paese OST, C.A.M. Original Soundtracks (2005)
 Fiorenza, CNR Entertainment (2009)
 Marte Live Compilation'', Various Artists, Procult (2004)

Curiosity
His album Stabat Mater - As Seen in Wong Kar Wai's "The Grandmaster" is iTunes Top 10 Original Score Albums in Belgium, Italy, France, Hong Kong, Taiwan.
Lentini collaborates with English songwriter Charlie Winston for the Main Title of the TV Series The Red Door. The song, titled "It's Not Impossible" was n#2 in the iTunes Soundtrack Chart in Italy.

References

 Zabriskie Point
 Film4Life
 Colonne Sonore.net

External links

Stefano Lentini, composer Official Site

Interview on Sound & Lite
Interview on Colonne Sonore.net
Interview on Film4Life
News on Cinema Italiano
Article on Postificio
Review on Postificio
News on Lettera 43
Review on italian newspaper Il Giornale
Review on italian site Zabriskie Point

1974 births
Living people
Italian male guitarists
Alumni of SOAS University of London
Italian male film score composers
21st-century guitarists
Musicians from Rome
Italian male composers
Italian film score composers